Weißbach is a town in the district of Hohenlohe in Baden-Württemberg in Germany.

Geography
Weißbach is situated in the middle of the Kochertal valley where the Langenbach flows into the Kocher. Its parts stretch from 200 to 430 meters above sea level and it is 10 km west of its district town Künzelsau. It consists of the formerly independent villages Weißbach and Crispenhofen and the two hamlets Halberg and Guthof.

Mayors
Since 1997: Rainer Züfle. He is the successor of  Manfred Görke. Züfle was reelected in 2005, 2013 and 2021.

Economy and Infrastructure

Companies
Konrad Hornschuch AG (Manufacturer of d-c-fix foils and of skai-artificial leather)

Education
Weißbach has a primary school and two Kindergarten run by the Protestant church and one library.

Sport
Weißbach has a gymnasium and in Crispenhofen there is a tennis court.

References

Hohenlohe (district)